The Minister for Government Services is the minister in the Government of Australia responsible for Services Australia. The current minister since 1 June 2022 is the Hon Bill Shorten MP, who also serves as Minister for the National Disability Insurance Scheme.

The portfolio was given its current title in machinery of government changes ordered by then-Prime Minister Scott Morrison following the 2019 federal election.

Scope
In the Government of Australia, the Minister is responsible for a number of welfare agencies and administers their portfolio through Services Australia and its component bodies:
 Child Support Agency
 Centrelink
 Australian Hearing
 CRS Australia
 Medicare Australia

The Department of Human Services was created on 26 October 2004, as part of the Finance Portfolio, to improve the development and delivery of Government social and health related services to the Australian people.

As a result of the Administrative Arrangements Orders (AAOs) issued on 30 January 2007, the Department of Human Services and its agencies were transferred to a newly created Human Services Portfolio.

The Minister for Government Services provides a central policy and coordination role for the delivery of services across the Portfolio as well as being the delivery agency for child support and vocational rehabilitation services. The AAOs of 25 January 2008 clarified the Department’s responsibility for the development of policy or service delivery, directed at ensuring the effective, innovative, and efficient delivery of Government services. The Department works with other departments and agencies to ensure early consideration of service delivery issues in the policy development process to improve the quality and cost effectiveness of service delivery by agencies in the Human Services Portfolio.

List of Ministers for Government Services
There was a Minister for Social Services or Social Security continuously from 1939 to 1998, when service delivery was partially privatised and residual functions were transferred to the Minister for Finance and Administration. In 2004, the position of Minister for Human Services was recreated to handle the residual functions; Scott Morrison renamed the portfolio to Government Services in 2019.

The following individuals have been appointed as Minister for Government Services, or any precedent titles:

References

External links
 

Government Services